The Society for Military History is a United States–based international organization of scholars who research, write, and teach military history of all time periods and places. It includes naval history, air power history, and studies of technology, ideas, and homefronts.  It publishes the quarterly refereed The Journal of Military History.

Activities
The society was established in 1933 as the American Military History Foundation, renamed in 1939 to the American Military Institute, and renamed again in 1990 to the Society for Military History. It has over 2,300 members, including many prominent scholars, soldiers, and citizens interested in military history. Membership is open to anyone and includes a subscription to the journal.

The Society also sponsors sessions on military topics at the annual Northern Great Plains History Conference.

Annual meetings

The Society typically holds a meeting in the first half of every year.

Recent meetings have been held in the following locations:

Current and past presidents
Gregory J. W. Urwin (President as of 2004)
Dennis Showalter
Carol Reardon
Theodore Ropp
Brian McAllister Linn
Jeffrey Grey
Roy K. Flint

Prizes

Samuel Eliot Morison Prize

The Samuel Eliot Morison Prize recognizes not any one specific achievement, but a body of contributions in the field of military history, stretching over time and showing a range of scholarly work contributing significantly to the field. Recent winners include:
 Brian McAllister Linn, Texas A&M University, 2023
 Beth Bailey, University of Kansas, 2022
 Robert M. Citino, National WWII Museum, 2021
 Jon Tetsuro Sumida, University of Maryland, 2020.
 Brian Holden-Reid, King's College London, 2019
 Hew Strachan, University of St Andrews, 2018
 John A. Lynn II, University of Illinois at Urbana-Champaign, 2017
 Conrad C. Crane, Army Heritage and Education Center, United States Army War College, 2016
 Joseph T. Glatthaar, University of North Carolina, Chapel Hill, 2015
 Rick Atkinson, Washington, DC, 2014
 Ira D. Gruber, Rice University, 2013
 Ronald H. Spector, The George Washington University, 2012
 Gerhard Weinberg, University of North Carolina, 2011
 Peter Maslowski, 2010
 Richard Kohn, 2009
 Jeremy Black, 2008
 James M. McPherson, 2007
 Robert A. Doughty, 2006
 Dennis Showalter, 2005
 Allan R. Millett, 2004
 Edward J. Drea, 2003
 John Shy, 2002
 Richard Overy, 2001
 David M. Glantz, 2000
 Geoffrey N. Parker, 1999
 Stephen E. Ambrose, 1998
 Robert M. Utley, 1997
 John Keegan, 1996
 Martin Blumenson, 1995
 Harold C. Deutsch, 1994
 Peter Paret, 1993
 Michael Howard, 1992
 I. B. Holley, Jr., and Theodore Ropp, 1991
 Edward M. Coffman, 1990
 Russell F. Weigley, 1989
 No Award, 1988
 Forrest C. Pogue, 1987
 Alvin D. Coox, 1986
 Robin Higham, 1985

Distinguished Book Awards
The Society's Distinguished Book Awards recognize the best books written in English on military history, broadly conceived.

2022

 Thomas A. Guglielmo, Divisions: A New History of Racism and Resistance in America's World War II Military, Oxford University Press
 Wendy Goldman and Donald Filtzer, Fortress Dark and Stern: The Soviet Home Front during World War II, Oxford University Press
 Ian Ona Johnson, Faustian Bargain: The Soviet-German Partnership and the Origins of the Second World War, Oxford University Press
 Michael S. Nieberg, When France Fell: The Vichy Crisis and the Fate of the Anglo-American Alliance, Harvard University Press
 Ruth Scurr, Napoleon, A Life Told in Gardens and Shadows, Penguin Random House
 Karen Hagemann, Stefan Dudink and Sonya O. Rose, editors, Oxford Handbook of Gender, War and the Western World Since 1600, Oxford University Press.

2021

 Donald F. Johnson, Occupied America: British Military Rule and the Experience of Revolution,University of Pennsylvania Press, 2021.
 Alexander Mikaberidze, The Napoleonic Wars: A Global History, Oxford University Press, 2020.
 Daniel Whittingham, Charles E. Callwell and the British Way in Warfare, Cambridge University Press, 2019.
 Aaron Sheehan-Dean, ed., The Cambridge History of the American Civil War, Cambridge University Press, 2019.
 Meighen McCrae, Coalition Strategy and the End of the First World War, Cambridge University Press, 2019.
 Alexander Watson, The Fortress: The Siege of Przemysl and the Making of Europe’s Bloodlands, Basic Books, 2020

2020

 Monica Kim, NYU, The Interrogation Rooms of the Korean War: The Untold History, Princeton University Press, 2019.
 Geoffrey Robinson, UCLA, The Killing Season: A History of the Indonesian Massacres, 1965-66, Princeton University Press, 2018.
 Stephen Brumwell, Turncoat: Benedict Arnold and the Crisis of American Liberty, Yale University Press, 2018.
 Kelly DeVries, Loyola University, and Michael Livingston, The Citadel, eds., Medieval Warfare: A Reader, University of Toronto Press, 2019.
 Thomas Dodman, Columbia University, What Nostalgia Was: War, Empire, and the Time of a Deadly Emotion, University of Chicago Press, 2019.

2019
A. Wilson Greene, A Campaign of Giants: The Battle for Petersburg Volume 1: From the Crossing of the James to the Crater (Civil War America), University of North Carolina Press, 2018
Peter Guardino, The Dead March: A History of the Mexican-American War, Harvard University Press, 2018.
Gonzalo M. Quintero Saravia, Bernardo de Gálvez: Spanish Hero of the American Revolution, University of North Carolina Press, 2018.
Richard P. Tucker, Tait Keller, J. R. McNeill, and Martin Schmid, editors, Environmental Histories of the First World War, Cambridge University Press, 2018.

2018
Christopher Phillips, The Rivers Ran Backward: The Civil War and the Remaking of the American Middle Border
Ilya Berkovich, Motivation in War: The Experience of Common Soldiers in Old-Regime Europe
Steven L. Ossad, Omar Nelson Bradley: America’s GI General
Paul R. Bartrop and Michael Dickerman, The Holocaust: An Encyclopedia and Document Collection, (4 vols.)

2017
Mark Edward Lender and Garry Wheeler Stone, Fatal Sunday: George Washington, the Monmouth Campaign, and the Politics of Battle
Tonio Andrade, The Gunpowder Age: China, Military Innovation, and the Rise of the West in World History
Laila Parsons, The Commander: Fawzi al-Qawuqji and the Fight for Arab Independence, 1914-1948
Michael Livingston and Kelly DeVries, editors. The Battle of Crécy: A Casebook

2016
David L. Preston, Braddock's Defeat: The Battle of the Monongahela and the Road to Revolution
Pierre Razoux, The Iran-Iraq War
Paul Robinson, Grand Duke Nikolai Nikolaevich: Supreme Commander of the Russian Army
David T. Zabecki, editor. Germany at War: 400 Years of Military History

2015
Andrew Jackson O'Shaughnessy, The Men Who Lost America: British Leadership, the American Revolution, and the Fate of the Empire
Alexander Watson, Ring of Steel: Germany and Austria-Hungary at War, 1914-1918
Michael V. Leggiere, Blucher: Scourge of Napoleon

2014
 Samuel J. Watson, Jackson's Sword: The Army Officer Corps on the American Frontier, 1810-1821 and Peacekeepers and Conquerors: The Army Officer Corps on the American Frontier, 1821-1846
 Geoffrey Parker, War, Climate Change and Catastrophe in the Seventeenth Century
 George W. Gawrych, The Young Ataturk: From Ottoman Soldier to Statesman of Turkey
 Spencer C. Tucker, editor, American Civil War: The Definitive Encyclopedia and Document Collection

2013
 Richard S. Faulkner, School of Hard Knocks: Combat Leadership in the American Expeditionary Forces
 Robert M. Citino, The Wehrmacht Retreats: Fighting a Lost War, 1943
 Geoffrey Roberts, Stalin’s General: The Life of Georgy Zhukov
 Clayton R. Newell and Charles R. Shrader, Of Duty Well and Faithfully Done: A History of the Regular Army in the Civil War

2012
 John Sloan Brown, Kevlar Legions: The Transformation of the U.S. Army, 1989-2005
 Mark Peattie, Edward Drea, and Hans van de Ven (eds.), The Battle for China: Essays on the Military History of the Sino-Japanese War of 1937-1945
 Mungo Melvin, Manstein: Hitler's Greatest General
 Steven E. Clay, US Army Order of Battle 1919-1941 (4 vols.)

2011
 Chad L. Williams, Torchbearers of Democracy: African American Soldiers in the World War I Era
 Peter H. Wilson, The Thirty Years War: Europe's Tragedy
 John MacFarlane, Triquet’s Cross: A Study of Military Heroism
 Clifford J. Rogers, ed. The Oxford Encyclopedia of Medieval Warfare and Military Technology

2010
 Daniel E. Sutherland, A Savage Conflict: The Decisive Role of Guerrillas in the American Civil War
 Edward J. Drea, Japan’s Imperial Army: Its Rise and Fall, 1853-1945
 J.P. Harris, Douglas Haig and the First World War
 Spencer C. Tucker, ed. The Encyclopedia of the Spanish-American and Philippine-American Wars

2009
 Ingo Trauschweizer, The Cold War U.S. Army: Building Deterrence for Limited War.
 Jamel Ostwald, Vauban Under Siege: Engineering Efficiency and Martial Vigor in the War of the Spanish Succession.
 Andy Wiest, Vietnam's Forgotten Army: Heroism and Betrayal in the ARVN.
 Philip Sabin, Hans van Wees, and Michael Whitby, eds. The Cambridge History of Greek and Roman Warfare.

2008
Jon Latimer, 1812: War with America
John Lawrence Tone, War and Genocide in Cuba, 1895-1898 
 Martha Hannah, Your Death Would Be Mine: Paul and Marie Pireaud in the Great War.
 Spencer C. Tucker, ed. The Encyclopedia of the Cold War: A Political, Social and Military History

2007
 John Grenier, The First Way of War: American War Making on the Frontier, 1607-1814.
 Robert A. Doughty, Pyrrhic Victory: French Strategy and Operations in the Great War. 
 Adrian Goldsworthy, Caesar: Life of a Colossus. 
 Peter Karsten, ed. Encyclopedia of War and American Society. 3 vols.

2006
 H. P. Willmott, The Battle of Leyte Gulf: The Last Fleet Action 
 George Satterfield, Princes, Posts and Partisans: The Army of Louis XIV and Partisan Warfare in the Netherlands (1673-1678)
 Steven E. Woodworth and Kenneth J. Winkle, Atlas of the Civil War 
 Colin White, ed., Horatio Nelson, The New Letters

2005
 Edward M. Coffman, The Regulars: The American Army, 1898-1941 
 Robert M. Citino, Blitzkrieg to Desert Storm: The Evolution of Operational Warfare 
 James T. Controvich, United States Army Unit and Organizational Histories: A Bibliography

2004
 George C. Rable, Fredericksburg! Fredericksburg! 
 Terry Copp, Fields of Fire: The Canadians in Normandy 
 Joshua Brown, ed., A Good Idea of Hell: Letters from a Chasseur a Pied 
 Michael J. Crawford, ed., The Naval War of 1812: A Documentary History: Volume III 1814-1815

2003
 Rick Atkinson, An Army at Dawn: The War in North Africa, 1942-1943
 Hew Strachan, The First World War. Volume I: To Arms 
 Stuart Hills, By Tank Into Normandy: A Memoir of the Campaign in North-West Europe From D-Day to VE Day 
 David S. Heidler and Jeanne T. Heidler, eds., Encyclopedia of the American Civil War: A Political and Military History (3 vol)

2002
 Mark Stoler, Allies and Adversaries: The Joint Chiefs of Staff, the Grand Alliances, and U.S. Strategy in World War II 
 Ronald H. Spector, At War At Sea: Sailors and Naval Combat in the Twentieth Century 
 Robert H. Ferrell, editor, for William S. Triplet, A Youth in the Meuse-Argonne, A Colonel in the Armored Divisions, and In the Philippines and Okinawa

2001
Geoffrey P. Megargee (2000): Inside Hitler's High Command (2000)

See also
 Military history 
 Military history of the United States
 Naval history

References

External links
 SMH website

Historical societies of the United States
Organizations established in 1933